The Rivers State Broadcasting Corporation (RSBC) is a government owned, controlled and funded public broadcaster in Rivers State, Nigeria. It was created by Edict No. 8 of 1973. The headquarters of the Corporation is at 2 Degema Street in Port Harcourt.

The RSBC was originally set up by the government of Alfred Diete-Spiff to serve as an "umbrella body" for the state's radio and television stations including Radio Rivers and Rivers State Television. The Corporation is headed by a General Manager. Literary icon, Gabriel Okara was the first person to be appointed to the post.

See also
List of government agencies of Rivers State
List of radio stations in Port Harcourt

References

Mass media in Rivers State
Broadcasting
Public broadcasting in Rivers State
1973 establishments in Nigeria
1970s establishments in Rivers State
Mass media companies based in Port Harcourt